Nikolay Aleksandrovich Aksyonov (born 8 June 1970 in Sortavala) is an  Olympic rower who competed for Russia in the two Olympic Games. He won bronze medal in the coxed eight competition in the 1996 Summer Olympics.

References

External links 
 
 
 
 

1970 births
Russian male rowers
Rowers at the 1996 Summer Olympics
Rowers at the 2000 Summer Olympics
Olympic rowers of Russia
Medalists at the 1996 Summer Olympics
Olympic medalists in rowing
Olympic bronze medalists for Russia
World Rowing Championships medalists for Russia
People from Sortavala
Living people
Sportspeople from the Republic of Karelia